Familial synovial chondromatosis with dwarfism is a rare genetic disorder characterized by a combination of both synovial chondromatosis and dwarfism. Only 3 families from Germany and the United States worldwide have been described with the disorder, and they showed either X-linked or autosomal dominant inheritance.

References 

Dwarfism
Rare diseases
Skeletal disorders